Brigadier General Avraham "Avi" Benayahu (born 1959), is a former Israel Defense Forces Spokesperson.

Benayahu was born and raised in Tel Aviv and studied in the Shevah Mofet secondary school. He was drafted in 1977 and later served in various roles in the IDF Spokesperson's Unit, including the press liaison and chief of the Israel Defense Forces Radio (Galatz). In August 2007 he was promoted to brigadier general and entered the position of IDF Spokesperson, which he filled until April 7, 2011.

References

External links
 CV of Avi Benayahu, in IDF site

1959 births
Army Radio commanders
Israel Defense Forces spokespersons
University of Haifa alumni
Israeli generals
Living people